Langstedt is a municipality in the district of Schleswig-Flensburg, in Schleswig-Holstein, Germany.

Langstedt located about 20 km south of Flensburg and 20 kilometers northwest of Schleswig in Schleswig's rural surroundings on the Schleswigschen Geest at Treene. The northern part of the more than 300 acres Büsch Auer Forst belongs to the municipality of Langstedt.

References

Municipalities in Schleswig-Holstein
Schleswig-Flensburg